Azovibrio restrictus is a species of bacteria. It is a root bacteria and is the only known species of its genus.

References

Further reading
Whitman, William B., et al., eds. Bergey's manual® of systematic bacteriology. Vol. 2. Springer, 2012.

External links

LPSN
Type strain of Azovibrio restrictus at BacDive -  the Bacterial Diversity Metadatabase

Rhodocyclaceae
Bacteria described in 2000